Mindbender is a 1994 film about Uri Geller directed by Ken Russell.

It had its premiere in 1994. Geller later said "Ken Russell's version was great but very exaggerated."

References

External links

Mindbender at Letterboxd

1996 films
American drama films
Israeli drama films
Films directed by Ken Russell
1990s English-language films
1990s American films